William Waymark Stanton (9 May 1890 – 1977) was an English professional footballer who played as a wing half in the Football League for Millwall, Rotherham County and Gainsborough Trinity.

Personal life 
Stanton worked as a carpenter and joiner. He served as an Air Mechanic in the Royal Flying Corps (latterly the Royal Air Force) during the First World War.

Career statistics

Honours 
Brentford
 London Combination: 1918–19

References

Footballers from the London Borough of Tower Hamlets
English footballers
Watford F.C. wartime guest players
English Football League players
Association football wing halves
Brentford F.C. wartime guest players
Rotherham County F.C. players
Millwall F.C. players
Llanelli Town A.F.C. players
Southern Football League players
1890 births
1977 deaths
Royal Flying Corps soldiers
Royal Air Force personnel of World War I
Worksop Town F.C. players
Gainsborough Trinity F.C. players
Royal Air Force airmen
Date of death unknown